Chromosome 11 open reading frame one, also known as C11orf1, is a protein-coding gene. It has been found by yeast two hybrid screen to bind to SETDB1 a histone protein methyltransferase enzyme. SETDB1 has been implicated in Huntington's disease, a neurodegenerative disorder.

C11orf1 is a nuclear protein with unknown function but has been shown to show preferential expression in some disease states in microarray data.

Species distribution 

C11orf1 shows conservation through mammals and orthologs can be found in sea squirts and sea anemone. The below table shows some orthologs found using BLAST.

Gene 

C11orf1 is located on chromosome 11 and is neighbored by:
 FDXACB1-201
 ALG9-201
 ALG9-202
 AP001781.5-201

Protein

Structure 

This protein is part of the UPF0686 superfamily. This family is characterized by the presence of a domain of unknown function (DUF)1143 shared by the family.  This family DUF1143 has a domain that includes almost all 149 of the 150 amino acids in the human ortholog. C11orf1 has six splicesomal variants and one unspliced variant.

Predicted properties 

The following properties of C11orf1 were predicted using bioinformatic analysis:
 Molecular Weight: 17.76 KDal
 Isoelectric point: 7.28
 Post-translational modification: twelve possible post-translational modifications are predicted:
 Two O-(N-acetylaminogalactosyl)-L-threonine Glycosylations at position 138 and 142 on the protein sequence
 Two O-phospho-L-serine Phosphorylation sites at 112 and 141.
 Four O-phospho-L-threonine Phosphorylation sites at 59, 99, 113, and 138.
 Four O4'-phospho-L-tyrosine Phosphorylation sites at 64, 101, 105 and 143.

Tissue distribution 

C11orf1 appears to be ubiquitously expressed at low levels but particularly high expression in the parathyroid. Expression data indicate expression in most tissues. This gene has also been found in one experiment to be under expressed in Huntington's disease patients while SETDB1 is over-expressed.

Binding partners 

The human protein SET domain bifurcated 1, was found to be a binding partner for C11orf1 by Yeast Two Hybrid.

References

External links

Further reading